Richard Piggott (July 6, 1888 – November 1966) was an American long-distance runner. He competed in the marathon at the 1912 Summer Olympics.

References

1888 births
1966 deaths
Athletes (track and field) at the 1912 Summer Olympics
American male long-distance runners
American male marathon runners
Olympic track and field athletes of the United States
Sportspeople from Medford, Massachusetts
20th-century American people